Charanda is an alcoholic spirit derived from sugarcane, similar to rum.

Typically the beverage is associated with the central portion of the State of Michoacán in Mexico, particularly the Purépecha-populated areas in the vicinity of the prominently agricultural City of Uruapan. Named after a hill range in the area called 'Cerro de la Charanda' where the first distillery was built in the region. Charanda is a term in Purépecha language meaning 'red-colored soil'.

Obtained through the distillation and rectification (double distillation) of sugarcane cold-extracted and then fermented juices. The result is a colorless crystalline spirit. When stored and aged in oak or encino barrels the spirit acquires hues of amber. Certain tonalities of blue are seen in Premium distillations from handpicked sugarcanes when a maceration process is added. Buttery sweet in taste, similar to vanilla. It is usually served at room temperature.

Charanda was granted protection with a declaration of 'Denominación de Origen Protegida' in 2003 (in English: Protected Designation of Origin or PDO), following the normatives regarding the quality of the sugarcanes used in the production, the characteristics and types of the final product, as well as the methods of extraction and production. It also norms and specifies the geographical region where the name of the spirit can be used for commercial use.

Charanda comes in many brands just like any other distilled spirit. Some of the most popular are "Tres Extra", "Tarasco" (three varieties: Blanco, Reposado and Añejo -Premium-), and "Uruapan" (three varieties: Blanco, Plata -Premium- and Real de Uruapan -Premium-).

References

Mexican alcoholic drinks
Liqueurs
Rums
Mexican Designation of Origin